Moacir Alves de Andrade Junior (born 3 January 1989), simply known as Moacir, is a Brazilian footballer who plays as an attacking midfielder.

He made his debut in the FNL for FC Gazovik Orenburg on September 1, 2011 in a game against FC Baltika Kaliningrad.

References

1989 births
Living people
Brazilian footballers
Association football midfielders
Campeonato Brasileiro Série B players
Campeonato Brasileiro Série C players
Desportivo Brasil players
Esporte Clube São Bento players
Ituano FC players
Associação Atlética Ponte Preta players
Botafogo Futebol Clube (SP) players
Oeste Futebol Clube players
Guaratinguetá Futebol players
Mogi Mirim Esporte Clube players
Associação Desportiva São Caetano players
Campinense Clube players
Associação Portuguesa de Desportos players
Liga Portugal 2 players
G.D. Estoril Praia players
Brazilian expatriate footballers
Brazilian expatriate sportspeople in Russia
Brazilian expatriate sportspeople in Portugal
Expatriate footballers in Portugal
Expatriate footballers in Russia
Association football forwards
FC Orenburg players